Palfuria helichrysorum is a spider species of the family Zodariidae.

Etymology
The species name is derived from the rosette bearing Asteraceae Helichrysum, which serves as a retreat for night active spiders.

Distribution
P. helichrysorum occurs in Malawi.

References

 Szüts, T. & Jocqué, R. (2001). A revision of the Afrotropical spider genus Palfuria (Araneae, Zodariidae). Journal of Arachnology 29(2):205–219. PDF

Zodariidae
Spiders of Africa
Spiders described in 2001